Eccoptocera is a genus of moths belonging to the subfamily Olethreutinae of the family Tortricidae.

Species
Eccoptocera australis Horak, 2006
Eccoptocera foetorivorans (Butler, 1881)
Eccoptocera implexa (Meyrick, 1912)
Eccoptocera osteomelesana (Swezey, 1946)
Eccoptocera palmicola (Meyrick, 1912)
Eccoptocera stenotes (Clarke, 1976)

See also
List of Tortricidae genera

References

External links
tortricidae.com

Eucosmini
Tortricidae genera
Taxa named by Thomas de Grey, 6th Baron Walsingham